Gulbene is a town in northeastern Latvia. It is an administrative center of Gulbene Municipality.

History

Historical documents first mention the 1224 land division act between the Order of the Sword Brothers and the Archbishop of Riga. In the 14th century, the Archbishop built a stone castle around which a populated place was formed.

The Evangelical Lutheran church (Brivības iela 13) was built on the ancient Latgalian castle mound in place of the later Middle Age brick castle from 1838–1843. The church is built in the classical style.

Vecgulbene (Old Gulbene) estate complex was built in the middle and second half of the 19th century not far off the church. The most significant buildings are the White Palace (Brivības iela 12), the Red Palace (Parka iela 1) and the magazine granary (Brivības iela 9). Both palaces have been destroyed and rebuilt several times. Since 1924 the elementary school of the city occupies the Red Palace.

After the construction of the Stukmani to Valka narrow-gauge railway in 1903 and subsequent broad-gauge line construction during World War I, Vecgulbene was established as an important railway junction, and in 1920 it was given the rights of a small village. During the first period of Latvian independence, besides those employed by the railways, small business, trades and crafts were the most important economic activities in the town. Gulbene was heavily damaged during the last years of World War II. After the war, during the Soviet occupation, Gulbene initially became a district, and later, in 1950, a regional centre. In the 1960s and 1970s branches of several major industrial companies were established in the city. Local enterprise was mainly involved with wood processing.

The most architecturally significant building in the area is the passenger building at Gulbene railway station, built in 1926 by the well-known professor of architecture Peteris Feders (1868 – 1936). It is one of the largest and most magnificent railway station buildings in Latvia.

Geography
There is one major town in the Gulbene municipality, and the region is separated into 13 smaller rural parishes. Gulbene is being developed as an environmentally-friendly territory.

Tourism
The Gulbenes Regional History and Art Museum displays one of the most valuable relics of Latvian museums - a chair designed by Julius Madernieks (1870–1955) made in the 1920s. Julius Madernieks was the founder of Latvian professional applied art born in Vecgulbenes parish and being notable person in city Gulbene.

Sports
The Gulbene municipality's biggest rivers (Gauja, Tirza and Pededze) are currently popular locations for nature tourism and water-sports, but once these were famous places for harvesting river-pearls. Cycling is enjoyed on local country paths.

Gulbene has a basketball team, Gulbenes Buki, playing in the higher division of the Latvian basketball league.

Media
The Gulbene region is served by a newspaper, Dzirkstele.

Gallery

Twin towns
 Babruysk, Belarus
 Rietavas, Lithuania
 Them, Denmark

Notable people
Inguna Sudraba, Latvia's Auditor General
Gido Kokars, conductor, choirmaster
Imants Kokars, conductor, choirmaster
Augusts Malvess, architect

See also

 List of cities in Latvia

References 

 
Towns in Latvia
1928 establishments in Latvia
Castles of the Teutonic Knights
Kreis Walk
Gulbene Municipality